Simen Brekkhus (born 6 May 1997) is a Norwegian football midfielder who currently plays for 3. divisjon side Fana.

He started his youth career in local clubs in his native Voss. In the summer of 2014 he moved to Sogndalsfjøra, and played for Sogndal Fotball's C team, soon the B team. He was drafted into the first-team squad, and made his debut in the first round of the 2015 Norwegian Football Cup. He made his Norwegian Premier League debut in March 2016 against Bodø/Glimt, starting the game. Ahead of the 2018 season he joined 3. divisjon side Fana.

References

1997 births
Living people
People from Voss
Norwegian footballers
Sogndal Fotball players
Norwegian First Division players
Eliteserien players
Florø SK players
Åsane Fotball players
Fana IL players
Association football midfielders
Sportspeople from Vestland